Nupla Khang is a mountain in the Mahalangur Himal section of the Himalayas along the border of Nepal and China.  The peak is situated between Cho Oyu to the east and Everest to the west.

Nupla Kahng was first climbed on 2 November 2018 by Garrett Madison, Ingvild Marie Settemsdel of Norway, Joshua Joseph Miller, Sidney Pattison, Kristin Ann Bennett, and Ben Veres, all from the US as part of a multinational expedition. Also climbing and part of the expedition were Nepalese Sherpa: Aang Phurba Sherpa, Pasdawa Sherpa, Kam Dorjee Sherpa, Tashi Sherpa, Lakpa Dendi and Pemba Tenzing.

References

Mountains of the Himalayas
Six-thousanders of the Himalayas
Mountains of Koshi Province